Adam Paul Rennocks (born 29 January 1982) is an English cricketer.  Rennocks is a right-handed batsman who bowls left-arm medium pace.  He was born in Leicester, Leicestershire.

Rennocks represented the Leicestershire Cricket Board in 3 List A matches.  These came against the Northamptonshire Cricket Board in the 1st round of the 2002 Cheltenham & Gloucester Trophy, and the Kent Cricket Board in the 2nd round of the same competition.  Both matches were held in 2001.  His third and final match came against the Kent Cricket Board in the 2nd round of the 2003 Cheltenham & Gloucester Trophy which was played in 2002.  In his 3 List A matches, he took 3 wickets at a bowling average of 28.00, with best figures of 1/23.

References

External links
Adam Rennocks at Cricinfo
Adam Rennocks at CricketArchive

1982 births
Living people
Cricketers from Leicester
English cricketers
Leicestershire Cricket Board cricketers